Novaya Murtaza (Yañı Mortaza) is a rural locality (a selo) in Chekmagushevsky District, Bashkortostan, Russia. The population was 164 as of 2010. There are 2 streets.

Geography 
Novaya Murtaza is located 22 km northeast of Chekmagush (the district's administrative centre) by road. Ilikovo is the nearest rural locality.

References 

Rural localities in Chekmagushevsky District